Albert Chainey Umphrey (born August 2, 1970) is a retired American gymnast. He competed in the 1996 Summer Olympics, helping the U.S. team to a 5th-place finish in the team all-around.

Early life
Umphrey was born in Albuquerque, New Mexico on August 2, 1970, and took up gymnastics at age 7. He attended Albuquerque Academy and graduated in 1988. While in Albuquerque, he trained at Gold Cup Gymnastics along with future Olympians Lance Ringnald and Trent Dimas.

Career
Umphrey competed in college gymnastics at UCLA, where he was an All-American and two-time team captain. He was a member of the U.S. national team from 1989 to 1997, competing at the World Artistic Gymnastics Championships in 1991, 1994, and 1996. His best result was a 4th-place finish on the horizontal bar in 1994. He also won a gold medal for the team all-around at the 1995 Pan American Games.

At the 1992 Olympic trials, Umphrey finished 8th, just 0.018 points short of making the seven-person team. He was able to rebound and finished 4th at the 1996 trials to gain a place on the U.S. Olympic team. At the 1996 Summer Olympics, he was held out of his best event, the horizontal bar, as well as the vault, a coaching decision that he called "devastating". Nevertheless, he was able to help the U.S. to a 5th-place finish in the team all-around, their best result since winning gold at the Soviet-boycotted 1984 Olympics.

Away from competition, Umphrey also worked to promote the sport of gymnastics and appeared at clinics around the United States. He was a guest on the children's program Mister Rogers' Neighborhood in 1986 and again in 1995, demonstrating gymnastics skills and training methods.

Umphrey retired from gymnastics in 2000 and returned to UCLA for medical school. He now practices in Physical medicine and rehabilitation in San Jose, California.

References

1970 births
Living people
African-American male gymnasts
American male artistic gymnasts
Gymnasts at the 1995 Pan American Games
Gymnasts at the 1996 Summer Olympics
Olympic gymnasts of the United States
Pan American Games gold medalists for the United States
Pan American Games medalists in gymnastics
Sportspeople from Albuquerque, New Mexico
21st-century African-American sportspeople
20th-century African-American sportspeople